Thomas Knak is a Danish electronic musician who has also produced work under the name Opiate. He worked with Björk on her Vespertine album and has produced remixes for Bomb the Bass and Coldcut. He also produced original music for the 2003 Danish film Reconstruction.

Discography
Objects for an Ideal Home (1999, April Records/Hobby Industries)
Dub Tractor/Thomas Knak Split EP (2001, City Centre Offices)
Dub Tractor/Thomas Knak Split EP (2001, Goodiepal)
Opto Files (2001, Raster-Noton)
While You Were Sleeping (2002, April Records)
Sometimes (2003, Morr Music)

Composer
Reconstruction (2003) - drama movie by Christoffer Boe
Allegro (2005) - drama movie by Christoffer Boe
Enemies of Happiness (2006) - documentary by Eva Mulvad
A Woman Among Warlords (2008) - documentary by Eva Mulvad

References

External links
 
 Opiate at Discogs

1973 births
Living people
Danish electronic musicians
Danish film score composers
Morr Music artists
20th-century Danish composers
20th-century Danish male musicians
21st-century Danish composers
21st-century male musicians
Male film score composers
Musicians from Copenhagen